Ken Herman is a current member of the Glendora City Council.

Herman was elected as a member of the Glendora City Council in 2002 in a recall election. Since then he's been re-elected to the council in 2003 and 2007 and served as the city's mayor in 2007–2008. Ken, a graduate of UCLA and Cal State Northridge, is a member of various boards such as the County Sanitation District, the LA Works Board of Directors, the Three Valleys Municipal Water District and the San Gabriel Valley Protective Association. He was also managing director of Bank of America Global Capital Markets for over thirty years.

Ken is married to his wife Joanne. They have lived in Glendora together for over 15 years and have two daughters as well as two grandchildren together.

References

External links
 Official Glendora website profile

Living people
Mayors of Glendora, California
Year of birth missing (living people)
University of California, Los Angeles alumni
California State University, Northridge alumni